The 2018–19 Hong Kong Premier League (also known as the BOC Life Hong Kong Premier League for sponsorship reasons) was the fifth season of the Hong Kong Premier League, the top division of Hong Kong football.

Tai Po won their first top flight title in club history. They are the third different team to win the Hong Kong Premier League and the first district team to win a top flight title since Yuen Long during the 1962–63 season.

Teams 
A total of 10 teams contest the league, including nine sides from the 2017–18 Hong Kong Premier League and one promoted from the 2017–18 Hong Kong First Division.

Stadia and locations 

Primary venues used in the Hong Kong Premier League:

Remarks:
1The capacity of Aberdeen Sports Ground is artificially reduced from 9,000 to 4,000 as only the main stand is opened for football matches.
2The capacity of Yanzigang Stadium is artificially reduced from 2,000 to 1,000.

Personnel and kits

Managerial changes

Foreign players 
The number of foreign players is restricted to six (including one Asian player) per team, with no more than four on pitch during matches. 
R&F are allowed to register a maximum of 3 foreigners at any one time.

League table

Positions by round 
To preserve chronological evolvements, any postponed matches are not included to the round at which they were originally scheduled, but added to the full round they were played immediately afterwards. For example, if a match is scheduled for round 7, but then played between rounds 8 and 9, it will be added to the standings for round 8.

Fixtures and results

Round 1

Round 2

Round 3

Round 4

Round 5

Round 6

Round 7

Round 8

Round 9

Round 10

Round 11

Round 12

Round 13

Round 14

Round 15

Round 16

Round 17

Round 18

Season Statistics

Top scorers

Hat-tricks 
Note: The results column shows the scorer's team score first. Teams in bold are home teams.

Attendances

Hong Kong Top Footballer Awards

References 

Hong Kong Premier League seasons
Hong Kong
2018–19 in Hong Kong football